The 1999 Saskatchewan general election was held on September 16, 1999 to elect members of the 24th Legislative Assembly of Saskatchewan. The new Saskatchewan Party took more votes than any other party but the NDP took more seats, taking half the seats in the Saskatchewan Legislature. The NDP formed a coalition with five elected Liberal Party MLAs to hold majority government.

Polls during the campaign indicated strong levels of support for the New Democratic Party government.  However, facing the fallout of a poor crop growing season and a scandal involving the Crown Corporation electric utility SaskPower (Channel Lake), the New Democrat government of Premier Roy Romanow – challenged by the newly created Saskatchewan Party – lost a significant share of the popular vote; winning exactly half of the fifty eight seats in the legislature.

The right-wing Saskatchewan Party was created during the sitting of the 23rd Assembly when much of the Progressive Conservative caucus joined forces with conservative Liberals who were unhappy with the leadership of Jim Melenchuk.

The new party was led by Elwin Hermanson, a former Reform Party federal Member of Parliament. In this election, it won 39.61% of the popular vote – slightly more than the NDP's 38.73%.  However, this was only enough for 25 seats, five short of making Hermanson premier. This was mainly because it was almost nonexistent in the province's more urban areas; it was completely shut out in Regina and won only one seat in Saskatoon.

The NDP was able to continue to govern with the support of some Liberal Members of the Legislative Assembly (MLAs).

Some NDP members unhappy with the government of Roy Romanow left to form the New Green Alliance, an environmentalist party. This party won about 1% of the popular vote, and no seats in the legislature.

What remained of the Progressive Conservatives fielded 14 paper candidates – all in NDP strongholds – in order to preserve their status as a registered political party.  The Tories did not actively campaign and won only a few votes.

To date, this is the most recent general election to return MLAs who were members of neither the NDP nor the Saskatchewan Party.

Results

Notes: * Party did not nominate candidates in previous election.
1 One constituency – Wood River – was initially won by the Liberals, but the result was overturned by the courts.  The Saskatchewan Party won the ensuing by-election.

Percentages

Ranking

8 closest ridings

 Wood River: Yogi Huyghebaert (SK Party) def. Glen McPherson (Lib) by 7 votes1
 Saskatoon Southeast: Pat Lorje (NDP) def. Grant Karwacki (Lib) by 38 votes
 Regina Wascana Plains: Doreen Hamilton (NDP) def. Dan Thibault (SK Party) by 119 votes
 Saskatoon Northwest: Jim Melenchuk (Lib) def. Grant Whitmore (NDP) by 127 votes
 Saskatchewan Rivers: Daryl Wiberg (SK Party) def. Jack Langford (NDP) by 156 votes
 Shellbrook-Spiritwood: Denis Allchurch (SK Party) def. Lloyd Johnson (NDP) by 301 votes
 Yorkton: Clay Serby (NDP) def. Lorne Gogal (SK Party) by 306 votes
 Meadow Lake: Maynard Sonntag (NDP) def. Bob Young (SK Party) by 323 votes

Notes: 1 see below under "Wood River controversy"

Riding results
People in bold represent cabinet ministers and the Speaker. Party leaders are italicized. The symbol " ** " represents MLAs who are not running again.

Northwest Saskatchewan

Northeast Saskatchewan

East Central Saskatchewan

Southwest Saskatchewan

Notes
1. Elhard was elected to the Legislature as a member of the Saskatchewan Party in a June 1999 by-election following the resignation and eventual conviction of former PC MLA Jack Goohsen.
2. see below under Wood River controversy

Southeast Saskatchewan

Saskatoon

Regina

Wood River controversy
The Wood River electoral district in the wake of the 1999 general election endured a nine-month crisis where it went without representation.  
On election night returns came back in favour of Saskatchewan Party candidate Yogi Huyghebaert who defeated incumbent Glen McPherson by just seven votes in unofficial returns. The close election results were challenged in the courts.

After five months a judicial decision came down and the results were certified on January 27, 2000. Saskatchewan Liberal Party incumbent Glen McPherson was declared by a judge the winner by a single vote defeating Yogi Huyghebaert from the Saskatchewan Party. The Saskatchewan Party decided to challenge the judicial decision, and it was overturned and dissolved based on irregularities in the absentee ballots.

The seat was dissolved and a by-election was called by Premier Roy Romanow on May 29, 2000. McPherson did not run in the subsequent by-election, choosing to reject the NDP-Liberal coalition. His candidacy for the Liberal party was replaced by Gerry Ruehs. Huyghebaert ended up winning the by-election.

See also
List of political parties in Saskatchewan
List of Saskatchewan provincial electoral districts

References
Saskatchewan Archives Board - Election Results By Electoral Division
Elections Saskatchewan

Notes

External links
Elections Saskatchewan
Saskatchewan Archives Board - Election Results By Electoral Division

1999 elections in Canada
1999
1999 in Saskatchewan
August 1999 events in Canada